Cheiloplasty or surgical lip restoration (from   kheilos – "lip") is the technical term for surgery of the lip usually performed by a plastic surgeon or oral and maxillofacial surgeon. Among other procedures it includes lip reduction, the process of surgically reducing the size of the lip or lips in order to reduce the appearance of abnormally large or protruding lips, as well as the process of forming an artificial tip or part of the lips by using a piece of healthy tissue from some neighboring part. The procedure can also be performed to enhance the upper and lower lip for those who wish to make their lips permanently larger.

References

External links 
 eMedicine: Lip reduction
 Cheiloplasty
 Cheiloplasty procedures
 lips surgery information

Oral and maxillofacial surgery
Oral surgery
Plastic surgery
Lip surgery